TV Patrol is a Philippine television newscast produced by ABS-CBN News. It premiered on March 2, 1987, at the former ABS-CBN television network, replacing Balita Ngayon. TV Patrol is the flagship national newscast of the network and is the longest-running Filipino language evening newscast. The newscast is anchored by Noli de Castro, Bernadette Sembrano, Henry Omaga-Diaz and Karen Davila. Previous anchors include Julius Babao, Korina Sanchez, Ted Failon and Mel Tiangco.

The program formerly aired on ABS-CBN until May 5, 2020, when the network was forced to cease and desist its broadcasting operations by orders of the National Telecommunications Commission after its legislative franchise expired on May 4. It was also simulcast through the network's flagship AM station DZMM and on its provincial AM stations.

TV Patrol currently broadcasts on cable and satellite via Kapamilya Channel, TeleRadyo and ANC, on free-to-air television via A2Z, and livestreaming online through the ABS-CBN News' website, Facebook, YouTube, iWantTFC, TFC IPTV and Kapamilya Online Live. It is also aired internationally through The Filipino Channel on cable and satellite.

History

Pre-launch
Following the People Power Revolution in February 1986 and the resumption of operations months later, ABS-CBN News executives, among them then-News Manager Angelo Castro Jr., began holding meetings with higher-ups on plans to launch an all-new news program that will serve as a replacement to Balita Ngayon. On March 1, 1987, ABS-CBN announced the launch of TV Patrol during the public variety extravaganza "Ang Pagbabalik ng Bituin" at Luneta Park, Manila.

1987–2001: Noli de Castro era

TV Patrol premiered on March 2, 1987, at 6:00 p.m. (UTC +8), replacing Balita Ngayon, with Noli de Castro, Mel Tiangco, and Robert Arevalo as the original anchors. Segment anchors included Ernie Baron, who served as the newscast's chief meteorologist and provided viewers trivia pertaining to science and history, and actress-personality Angelique Lazo who first hosted Star News, an entertainment news segment. However, on June 1, 1987, Arevalo left the newscast and was replaced by Frankie Evangelista, who served as a segment host for "PULSO: Pangkalahatang Ugnayan Laan sa Opinyon".

With the introduction of international broadcasts in 1989 to the Pacific islands of Guam and Saipan, and later with the birth of The Filipino Channel in 1994, TV Patrol became the first Philippine newscast and program to be broadcast overseas.

In 1993, Christine Bersola joined the newscast to host the Star News segment, replacing Lazo, until 1996. In 1995, Korina Sánchez joined the newscast, replacing Tiangco who left ABS-CBN for GMA Network. De Castro would eventually become the sole anchor of the newscast in 1996, reducing its airtime to 30 minutes.

On January 4, 1999, the newscast returned its airtime to one hour and 30 minutes. On February 14, 2000, TV Patrol started its simulcast over AM radio stations DZMM (Manila), DYAB (Cebu), and DXAB (Davao) and began its online presence through the ABS-CBN News website. On February 5, 2001, de Castro left the newscast to run for Senator.

2001–2004: Korina Sanchez era

On March 5, 2001, Korina Sanchez, Henry Omaga-Diaz, and Aljo Bendijo took over as the new anchors. On April 21, 2003, Julius Babao replaced Omaga-Diaz and Bendijo. In the same year, TV Patrol became simulcast on ABS-CBN's UHF station Studio 23 for a several months. The program also adopted the ABS-CBN News slogan "Subok na Maaasahan" in 2004.

2004–2010: TV Patrol World/Ted Failon era

On November 22, 2004, the program was relaunched as TV Patrol World with Julius Babao, Karen Davila and Ted Failon as its main anchors, while special segments are anchored by Bernadette Sembrano, Ernie Baron and Phoemela Baranda, respectively. Baron died of a heart attack on January 23, 2006, and months later, he was replaced by Kim Atienza as the newscast's resident weatherman.

In March 2007, TV Patrol World began its simulcast on TeleRadyo, the newly-launched cable television channel of DZMM. On November 25 of the same year, ABS-CBN aired a documentary special for TV Patrol's 20th anniversary entitled TV Patrol: 20 Taon ng Pagpapatrol. It was produced by ABS-CBN and Jesuit Communications.

2010–2015: Relaunch, return of former anchors and 25th anniversary

On June 30, 2010, TV Patrol World reverted to its original title TV Patrol and introduced its first website, Facebook and Twitter pages.

On October 4 of the same year, a new program segment, "Winner sa Life!" with Winnie Cordero was launched with reports on lifestyle and tips on proper living.

On November 3, 2010, ABS-CBN announced the return of veteran former anchors Noli de Castro and Korina Sanchez as weeknight anchors of TV Patrol, replacing Julius Babao and Karen Davila, as they would transfer to Bandila; they joined Ted Failon on November 8. On the same day (November 8), Gretchen Fullido became a new Star Patrol segment anchor, replacing Baranda.

On July 29, 2012, a documentary special entitled Mga Nagbabagang Balita: 25 Taon ng TV Patrol was aired in celebration of its 25th anniversary. It was re-aired on August 12.

2015–2020: Noli de Castro, Bernadette Sembrano, and Ted Failon

On August 3, 2015, former TV Patrol Weekend anchor Bernadette Sembrano was named as the new main co-anchor, replacing Sanchez who initially went on an indefinite leave earlier in the year before eventually leaving the newscast for good.

On March 2, 2017, TV Patrol celebrated its 30th anniversary through a live newscast in its studio in Manila and its sister stations in Tacloban and Zamboanga City. Sembrano was situated at the ABS-CBN studio in Manila while Failon was in Tacloban and de Castro in Zamboanga.

Beginning August 24, 2017, the show featured celebrities as "Star Patrol" guest anchors, a segment that has been returned after quite some time. Yassi Pressman, Toni Gonzaga, Bela Padilla, Kim Chiu, Bianca Gonzales, Erich Gonzales, Kylie Verzosa, Mariel de León, Janella Salvador, Aiko Meléndez, Karylle, Karla Estrada, and Anne Curtis filled in the slot of Fullido occasionally. Earlier in 2015, actresses Yam Concepción and Loren Burgos, and athlete Gretchen Ho took the helm as pinch-hitters for the segment.

On April 2, 2018, TV Patrol began broadcasting in high definition.

COVID-19 pandemic
On March 17, 2020, TV Patrol began to air on a late night timeslot (as a replay), temporarily replacing the timeslot of late-night newscast Bandila due to the enhanced community quarantine in Luzon caused by the COVID-19 pandemic in the Philippines. On the same day, it began to be simulcast on ANC, the first ever simulcast since the cable channel's 1996 launch. The decision to adopt late night replays led to yet another adjustment, with the telecast frequently extending their airtime to at least two hours. This led to a shift in Primetime Bida's schedule during the enhanced community quarantine.

In April, sign language interpreters were added to the broadcast.

ABS-CBN shutdown
On May 5, 2020, TV Patrol was the last program to be aired on ABS-CBN, MOR, and S+A before they signed-off indefinitely that night (DZMM and its television counterpart, TeleRadyo, also aired this edition of the newscast but signed off together at 8:20 p.m. following S.R.O.: Suhestyon, Reaksyon at Opinyon), following the cease-and-desist order of the National Telecommunications Commission (NTC) to close the free TV and radio broadcasting operations of ABS-CBN as the network's broadcasting franchise expired the day before.

The special edition focused on the cease-and-desist order of the NTC closing the network's free TV and radio broadcasting operations and featured statements by ABS-CBN president and chief executive officer Carlo Katigbak and chairman Mark Lopez, appealing the cease and desist order. The program also aired without commercial breaks.

As a result, on May 7, 2020, the newscast temporarily migrated to ANC, The Filipino Channel, Cine Mo!, and on social media platforms such as Facebook, YouTube, and iWant, with ANC assuming the program's production. TeleRadyo would return simulcasting the newscast on May 8, 2020.

On June 30, 2020, the newscast temporarily ended on free-to-air television due to the cease-and-desist order on ABS-CBN TVplus.

TV Patrol was supposed to simulcast on Kapamilya Channel, the network's ad interim replacement to ABS-CBN for cable and satellite providers beginning June 15, 2020, but the newscast was instead excluded from its programming schedule until July 27. According to Atienza and Fullido, this was because the newscast was already broadcasting on ANC, other digital channels, and social media platforms. TV Patrol airtime was shortened from 110 minutes to 90 minutes during this period.

Failon's departure
On August 30, 2020, ABS-CBN Corporation announced that Ted Failon would be leaving the network as part of its retrenchment program and transferred to TV5; his final appearance was on August 31 via Zoom. The departure of Failon also led the August 31, 2020 edition to end with the song "Tinig ng mga Nawalan" (English: Voice of the Lost), sung by Kathryn Bernardo and Daniel Padilla in support for the retrenched employees. From September 7 to October 2, former weekday anchors Julius Babao, Karen Davila, Henry Omaga-Diaz, and current weekend anchor Alvin Elchico rotated as the third anchor on the weeknight edition while Failon's replacement was yet to be determined.

2020–2021: Noli de Castro, Bernadette Sembrano, and Henry Omaga-Diaz

On September 30, 2020, Davila announced on her Instagram account that former anchor Henry Omaga-Diaz was named as the permanent replacement to Failon beginning on October 5; ABS-CBN confirmed the development on October 4.

From April 21 to May 4, 2021, De Castro, Sembrano, and Omaga-Diaz were on self-quarantine, with Sembrano later testing positive for COVID-19. Given this, Elchico, Hernandez, Davila, Babao, and Jorge Cariño rotated as the three temporary weeknight anchors. The newscast temporarily aired live from an outdoor area within the ABS-CBN premises, while Fullido and Atienza were seen via Zoom, instead of the regular news studio. On May 5, the news studio was used once again for broadcast, although de Castro, Atienza, and Fullido were the only anchors present, four days after Sembrano announced that she had recovered from the disease.

Departure of Atienza and de Castro
On October 1, 2021, Atienza made his final appearance as the program's resident weather presenter as he would transfer to rival network GMA Network on October 4.

Six days later on October 7, de Castro once again left the newscast as the main anchor, to once again run for Senator; however, he later withdrew his candidacy.

2021–2023: Bernadette Sembrano, Henry Omaga-Diaz, and Karen Davila

On October 8, ABS-CBN News confirmed that former anchor Karen Davila was named as the replacement to de Castro; she joined Omaga-Diaz and Sembrano on October 11. With her arrival, Omaga-Diaz was promoted as the lead anchor.

On October 25, TV Patrol launched three new segments: "Winning Moment" with Winnie Cordero, "Alam N'yo Ba?" with Boyet Sison, and the returning "Mga Kwento ni Marc Logan" with Marc Logan, until Sison's death on April 16, 2022. On December 13, former PAGASA Weather Specialist Ariel Rojas joined as the resident weather meteorologist as the permanent replacement to Atienza.

On December 31, former anchor Julius Babao made his final appearance on the newscast as a relief anchor and announced that he would be leaving the network and transfer to TV5.

35th anniversary; return to free-to-air television 
On January 1, 2022, TV Patrol officially began its simulcast on A2Z, marking its return to free-to-air television, almost two years since the newscast made its last broadcast on ABS-CBN and Cine Mo!. With this historic return came a brand new opening billboard, logo, and on-air graphics introduced on January 3. Another new segment in "Uso at Bago" with Migs Bustos was launched.

From May 27 to November 1, 2022, the free-to-air broadcast on TeleRadyo resumed as a digital subchannel of A2Z.

2023–present: Noli de Castro, Bernadette Sembrano, Henry Omaga-Diaz, and Karen Davila 
On January 9, 2023, Noli de Castro returned to the newscast for the third time as the fourth main anchor. This is the only time being had reviving the four-presenter format since 1987. This is done to compete against other national newscasts such as GMA and GTV's 24 Oras, TV5's Frontline Pilipinas, Net 25's Mata ng Agila Primetime and PTV 4's Ulat Bayan.

TV Patrol Weekend

Initially being aired during special occasions since its inception, the Saturday edition of the newscast called TV Patrol Sabado premiered on February 14, 2004 at 7:30 p.m., while the Sunday edition called TV Patrol Linggo premiered on May 9 of the same year at 6:30 p.m., on the eve of the 2004 presidential elections. Both editions were Originally anchored by Ces Oreña-Drilon and Henry Omaga-Diaz.

At the beginning, both editions were complemented by The Weekend News as ABS-CBN's weekend newscasts with TV Patrol Sabado and TV Patrol Linggo as the early-evening newscast and The Weekend News as the late-night newscast until the latter was cancelled more than a year later. During this period, the weekend editions used to occupy middle evening time slots between 8:00 and 10:00 p.m..

On 2005, Oreña-Drilon left the weekend edition for ABS-CBN Insider and was replaced by Bernadette Sembrano.

On July 8, 2006, Alex Santos replaced Henry Omaga-Diaz, who left the weekend edition for Bandila.

On July 3, 2010, three days after the revamp of the regular edition, the two weekend editions were merged into TV Patrol Weekend. reformat since 2004. This is done to compete against other national newscasts such as GMA and GTV's 24 Oras Weekend, TV5 and One PH's Aksyon Weekend now Frontline Pilipinas Weekend, Net 25's Mata ng Agila Weekend and PTV 4's The Weekend News now Ulat Bayan Weekend.

On November 26, 2011, Santos and Sembrano were replaced by Pinky Webb and Alvin Elchico.

On May 6, 2015, Webb left the network to join CNN Philippines. With this, she was temporarily replaced alternately by various ABS-CBN reporters/anchors (including former anchor Bernadette Sembrano prior to August 3 of the same year where she became Sanchez's replacement in the regular edition of the newscast) until Zen Hernandez became her permanent replacement on July 9, 2016.

On April 1, 2018, the weekend edition started to be shown in High Definition.

Beginning March 21, 2020, the program expanded to 45 minutes in weekends, and on March 28 began airing on both TeleRadyo and the ABS-CBN News Channel for the first time in 16 years (Sundays only, with program beginning a Saturday broadcast on ANC beginning April 25 that same year). The broadcast's return to DZMM TeleRadyo was the first to be aired there after ten years of absence.

On May 9, 2020, the weekend edition began to be aired in Cine Mo! after ABS-CBN went off-air on May 5, 2020, due to cease-and-desist order from the National Telecommunications Commission after its franchise expired on May 4, 2020, while on TeleRadyo it began to broadcast on Saturdays. The newscast also extended its broadcast time to 50 minutes, and later on to a full hour.

On August 1, 2020, the weekend edition began airing on the Kapamilya Channel. On October 31, 2020, the weekend edition expanded its airtime from 45 minutes to an hour.

On January 1, 2022, the weekend edition returned on free-to-air television via simulcast on A2Z.

Theme music

TV Patrol originally used Vangelis' "Pulstar" as its very first theme music, from March 2, 1987 to November 4, 1994. This theme had also been used prior by Univision owned-and-operated station WLTV-TV.

On November 7, 1994, "Pulstar" was replaced by Ryan Cayabyab's "ABS-CBN News Theme," which served as the theme of TV Patrol and the ABS-CBN News and Public Affairs division until 1996. The theme was used as a theme music for The World Tonight which airs on the ABS-CBN News Channel (ANC) from 1999 up to 2018, with slight and more modern re-composition.

In 1996, when Noli de Castro became the sole anchor of the newscast, it adopted Gari Communications' "Allegro" from KPIX-TV, a CBS-owned TV station in San Francisco, California, although the news theme had also been used by KBAK-TV.

On March 5, 2001, when de Castro left the show for the elections and Korina Sanchez, Henry Omaga Diaz and Aljo Bendijo replaced him as the new anchors, the Filipino composition of "Allegro" was done with elements from the orchestra version and combined the elements of the original 1996–2001 version, the 1994–96 ABS-CBN News Theme, and the ABS-CBN's jingle.

The theme underwent re-compositions in 2002 (which was also the 2004–2006 TV Patrol Sabado/Linggo theme), 2003, 2004, and 2006, which was rearranged and composed by Neocolours' Jimmy Antiporda.

The theme music used since June 30, 2010 incorporates the elements of "Pulstar," TV Patrol's 2001 theme, and TV Patrol World's 2004 and 2006 theme music and has been the newscast's longest-used theme music.

Anchors

Weeknight anchors 
 Noli de Castro (1987–2001, 2010–2021, 2023–present)
 Bernadette Sembrano (2005–2011, 2015–present)
 Henry Omaga-Diaz (2001–2003, 2004–2006, 2020–present)
 Karen Davila (2004–2010, 2021–present)

Weekend anchors 
 Alvin Elchico (2011–present; weekday fill-in anchor 2018–present)
 Zen Hernandez (2016–present; weekday fill-in anchor 2015–present)

Segment anchors 
 Ariel Rojas (2021–present; "Weather Patrol", "Kwentong Napa Panahon")
 Bernadette Sembrano (2004–present; "Lingkod Kapamilya")
 Dyan Castillejo ("Sports Patrol")
 Gretchen Fullido (2010–present; "Star Patrol")
 Marc Logan (1996–present; "Mga Kwento ni Marc Logan")
 Migs Bustos (2022–present; "Uso at Bago" & "Alam N’yo ba?")
 Noli de Castro (2012–2021; 2023–present; "KBYN Special Report", formerly "Kabayan Special Patrol")
 Winnie Cordero (2010–present; "Winning Moment")

Former anchors

Weeknight anchors 
 Aljo Bendijo (2001–2003)
 Frankie Evangelista (1987–1996)
 Gel Santos-Relos (1990–1996)
 Julius Babao (2003–2010)
 Kata Inocencio (1995-1996)
 Korina Sanchez (1995–1996, 2001–2004, 2010–2015)
 Mel Tiangco (1987–1995)
 Robert Arevalo (1987)
 Ted Failon (1995–1996, 2004–2020)

Weekend edition 
 Alex Santos (2006–2011)
 Ces Drilon (2004–2005)
 Pinky Webb (2011–2015)

Segment anchors 
 Angelique Lazo (1987–1993; "Star News")
 Boyet Sison (2021–2022; "Alam N'yo Ba?")
 Christine Bersola-Babao (1993–1996; "Star News")
 Ernie Baron (1987–2006; weather)
 Kim Atienza (2006–2021; "Weather Weather Lang" and "Kaunting Kaalaman")
 Phoemela Baranda (2005–2010; "Star Patrol")
 Tina Monzon-Palma (2006–2014; "Lingkod Kapamilya")

Regional editions
From 1988 to 2020, the regional editions of the newscast that are delivered in other Philippine languages, collectively credited as TV Patrol Regional, were broadcast on all ABS-CBN Regional stations nationwide, with simulcast on the network's four provincial Radyo Patrol AM Radio stations, DYAB TeleRadyo Cebu and selected MOR FM radio stations.

All regional editions aired in the late afternoon until ABS-CBN ceased free TV and radio operations on May 5, 2020, with selected editions simulcast over The Filipino Channel for overseas viewers. Several newscasts were also aired nationwide from August 2016 to January 2018 on the ABS-CBN Regional Channel via Sky Cable, Destiny Cable, and Sky Direct. The ABS-CBN Regional YouTube page also includes archived videos of past editions for those who have not watched the program as well as for overseas viewers.

On May 8, 2020, the regional editions resumed broadcasts through their respective Facebook pages and the ABS-CBN Regional YouTube channel. However, on July 15, 2020, ABS-CBN announced that the company would go into retrenchment on August 31 in light of the denial of its bid for a legislative franchise, laying-off much of its employees. It was further revealed on July 17, 2020, during an interview on Failon Ngayon sa TeleRadyo that the regional division of ABS-CBN News would fold after regular business hours on the said retrenchment date. Included in the shutdown is the halt of all its regional programs and their respective TV Patrol editions with their last broadcasts aired on August 28, 2020.

Final editions

Luzon
TV Patrol Bicol (1996–2020)
TV Patrol North Luzon (1995–2020)
TV Patrol Palawan (1997–2006; 2011–2020)
TV Patrol Southern Tagalog (2009–2020)

Visayas
TV Patrol Central Visayas (1988–2020) 
TV Patrol Eastern Visayas (1998–2020)
TV Patrol Negros (1988–2020)
TV Patrol Panay (1998–2020)

Mindanao
TV Patrol Chavacano (1995–2020)
TV Patrol North Mindanao (1995–2020)
TV Patrol South Central Mindanao (1996–2020)
TV Patrol Southern Mindanao (1989–2020)

Defunct editions
TV Patrol Cagayan de Oro/Iligan/Nuebe Patrol (relaunched as TV Patrol Northern Mindanao then TV Patrol North Mindanao)
TV Patrol Naga/Legazpi (merged into TV Patrol Bicol)
TV Patrol Cebu/Dumaguete (merged into TV Patrol Central Visayas)
TV Patrol Tuguegarao/Isabela (merged into TV Patrol Cagayan Valley, later merged with TV Patrol North Luzon)
TV Patrol Baguio (relaunched asTV Patrol Northern Luzon, later TV Patrol North Luzon)
TV Patrol Laoag (relaunched as TV Patrol Ilocos, later merged with TV Patrol North Luzon)
TV Patrol Iloilo (relaunched as TV Patrol Panay)
TV Patrol 4 (renamed as TV Patrol Western Visayas, then TV Patrol Bacolod, until renamed TV Patrol Negros)
TV Patrol Western Visayas (now comprising TV Patrol Negros and TV Patrol Panay)
TV Patrol Butuan (relaunched as TV Patrol Caraga, later merged to TV Patrol North Mindanao)
TV Patrol Mindanao (scaled down as TV Patrol Davao, then reverted to its original title, until renamed TV Patrol Southern Mindanao)
TV Patrol Dagupan (relaunched as TV Patrol North Central Luzon, later merged with TV Patrol North Luzon)
Palawan TV Patrol (relaunched as TV Patrol Palawan)
TV Patrol Zamboanga (relaunched as TV Patrol Chavacano)
TV Patrol Cotabato (relaunched as TV Patrol Central Mindanao, later merged to TV Patrol South Central Mindanao)
TV Patrol General Santos (relaunched as TV Patrol Socsksargen and later as TV Patrol South Central Mindanao)
TV Patrol Pagadian (relaunched as TV Patrol Northwestern Mindanao, then replaced by Nuebe Patrol and later merged to TV Patrol North Mindanao)
TV Patrol Pampanga  (axed in 2018; scaled down to short News Patrol Kapampangan bulletin opt-outs, later merged with TV Patrol North Luzon)
TV Patrol Tacloban (fused into TV Patrol Eastern Visayas)

International broadcast
TV Patrol Weekend airs in Australia with a delayed telecast the next morning on SBS WorldWatch every Sunday and Monday, while TV Patrol is aired every Tuesday to Saturday. Prior to the WorldWatch channel launch, TV Patrol was aired on SBS' World Watch news block via SBS and SBS Viceland.

TV Patrol (weeknight and weekend editions) are aired worldwide via The Filipino Channel, with the weeknight edition also broadcast to overseas Filipino viewers on KNET/KBEH (Crossings TV) in Los Angeles, California, KIKU-TV in Honolulu, Hawaii, KBTV-CD (Crossings TV) in Sacramento, California, and KTSF/KQTA-LD (Crossings TV) in San Francisco/Oakland/San Jose, California.

Reception
In October 1988, early in the program's run, Meg Mendoza of the Manila Standard criticized the show's format, stating that "we still prefer [GMA Balita] since we can't stand the blood and gore being shown.... Sensationalism may be good for the ratings but there's no substitute to honest and intelligent reporting."

In 1989, poet and literary critic Virgilio S. Almario was critical of TV Patrol's use of Filipino "siyokoy" words, loanwords from the Spanish or English language that are formed through a misunderstanding of Spanish grammar. As examples, Almario highlighted the use of the words "aspeto," "parliyamento," "pesante," and "konsernado," which he respectively corrected as "aspekto," "parlamento," "magsasaka," "paisano" or "magbubukid," and "konsernido." However, he still commends the program for "passionately" delivering news in the Filipino language.

Accolades

The national TV Patrol and its anchors and reporters throughout the two decades of broadcast got various local, national, and even international recognitions, such as the Asian TV Awards, New York Festivals, and the International Emmy Awards, as reported in the ABS-CBN Corporate Annual Reports. On its 1987 launch, TV Patrol got a winning nod from the 1st Star Awards for Television formed by the Philippine Movie Press Club (PMPC). Main anchor Noli de Castro won the Best Male News Anchor that year. The provincial editions of TV Patrol Regional and their respective news teams also got notable local and national recognitions (including from KBP Golden Dove Awards and Catholic Mass Media Awards.) Among the award-winning provincial editions and regional news teams hail from TV Patrol North Luzon, TV Patrol Palawan, TV Patrol Panay, TV Patrol Negros, TV Patrol Central Visayas, TV Patrol Eastern Visayas, TV Patrol South Central Mindanao and TV Patrol Southern Mindanao.

References

External links

1987 Philippine television series debuts
1980s Philippine television series
1990s Philippine television series
2000s Philippine television series
2010s Philippine television series
2020s Philippine television series
ABS-CBN News and Current Affairs shows
ABS-CBN news shows
ABS-CBN original programming
ABS-CBN News Channel original programming
Filipino-language television shows
Flagship evening news shows
Philippine television news shows
Sign language television shows